Denis Ivanovich Fonvizin (—) was a playwright and writer of the Russian Enlightenment, one of the founders of literary comedy in Russia. His main works are two satirical comedies, one of them Young ignoramus, which mock contemporary Russian gentry and are still staged today.

Life
Denis Fonvizin was born in Moscow into a noble Russian Orthodox family, the first of eight children. His mother Ekaterina Vasilievna Fonvizina (née Dmitrieva-Mamonova) (born 1718) belonged to the Smolensk Rurik branch on her father's side and to the Grushetsky family on her mother's side; she was a cousin-niece of Tsaritsa Agafya Grushetskaya and an aunt to Alexander Dmitriev-Mamonov who was famously a lover of Catherine the Great.

His father Ivan Fonvizin (1705—1785) started as an army officer, then served in the Collegium of Accounting, becoming a State Councillor in 1783. His ancestor baron Berndt von Wiesen belonged to the Livonian Order, was captured during the Livonian War and became a naturalized Russian citizen; his descendants russified, the family name transformed with years, but it was Ivan Andreevich who started writing it as Fonvizin.

Denis Fonvizin received good education at the Imperial Moscow University and very early began writing and translating. He entered the civil service, becoming secretary to Count Nikita Panin, one of the great noblemen of Catherine the Great's reign. Because of Panin's protection, Fonvizin was able to write critical plays without fear of being arrested, and, in the late 1760s, he brought out the first of his two famous comedies, The Brigadier-General.

A man of means, he was always a dilettante rather than a professional author, though he became prominent in literary and intellectual circles. In 1777-78 he traveled abroad, the principal aim of his journey being the medical faculty of Montpellier. He described his voyage in his Letters from France — one of the most elegant specimens of the prose of the period, and the most striking document of that anti-French nationalism which in the Russian elite of the time of Catherine went hand in hand with a complete dependence on French literary taste.

In 1782 appeared Fonvizin's second and best comedy The Minor, which definitely classed him as the foremost of Russian playwrights. His last years were passed in constant suffering and traveling abroad for his health. He died in Saint Petersburg in 1792.

Works and influence
Fonvizin's reputation rests almost entirely on his two comedies, which are beyond doubt the most popular Russian plays before Aleksander Griboyedov's Woe from Wit. They are both in prose and adhere to the canons of classical comedy. Fonvizin's principal model, however, was not Molière, but the great Dano-Norwegian playwright Ludvig Holberg, whom he read in German, and some of whose plays he had translated.

Both comedies are plays of social satire with definite axes to grind. The Brigadier-General is a satire against the fashionable French semi-education of the petits-maîtres. It is full of excellent fun, and though less serious than The Minor, it is better constructed. But The Minor, though imperfect in dramatic construction, is a more remarkable work and justly considered Fonvizin's masterpiece.

The point of the satire in The Minor is directed against the brutish and selfish crudeness and barbarity of the uneducated country gentry. The central character, Mitrofanushka, is the accomplished type of vulgar and brutal selfishness, unredeemed by a single human feature — even his fondly doting mother gets nothing from him for her pains. The dialogue of these vicious characters (in contrast to the stilted language of the lovers and their virtuous uncles) is true to life and finely individualized; and they are all masterpieces of characterization — a worthy introduction to the great portrait gallery of Russian fiction.

As a measure of its popularity, several expressions from The Minor have been turned into proverbs, and many authors (amongst whom Alexander Pushkin) regularly cite from this play, or at least hint to it by mentioning the characters' names.

Notes

References

1744 births
1792 deaths
18th-century dramatists and playwrights
18th-century poets from the Russian Empire
18th-century male writers
18th-century translators
French–Russian translators
Members of the Russian Academy
Moscow State University alumni
People of the Age of Enlightenment
Russian civil servants
Russian male dramatists and playwrights
Russian male writers
Russian people of German descent
Russian people of Polish descent
Russian translators
Translators from German
Writers from Moscow
Burials at Lazarevskoe Cemetery (Saint Petersburg)